Xalitla azteca is a species of beetle in the family Cerambycidae. It was described by Lane in 1959.

References

Neoibidionini
Beetles described in 1959